A referendum on merging the regional and departmental governments was held in French Guiana on 24 January 2010. The proposal was approved by 57% of voters.

Results

References

Referendums in French Guiana
2010 in French Guiana
2010 referendums
January 2010 events in South America